Hiratsuka Raichō (transliterated  according to the historical kana orthography; born Hiratsuka Haru, ; February 10, 1886 – May 24, 1971) was a Japanese writer, journalist, political activist, anarchist, and pioneering feminist in Japan.

Life 
Born in Tokyo in 1886, the second daughter of a high ranking civil servant, and educated at Japan Women's University in 1903, Hiratsuka came to be influenced by contemporary currents of European philosophy, as well as Zen Buddhism, of which she would become a devoted practitioner. Of particular influence to her was turn-of-the-century Swedish feminist writer Ellen Key, some of whose works she translated into Japanese, and the individualistic heroine of Henrik Ibsen's A Doll's House (1879). Hiratsuka was also interested in the works of Baruch Spinoza, Meister Eckhart, and G. W. F. Hegel during her time at Japan Women's University. In 1908 she attempted a double-suicide with Morita Sōhei, her teacher – a married writer – and a disciple of novelist Natsume Soseki, in the mountains of Nasushiobara, Tochigi. The pair were found alive on the mountain, but the attempted suicide by such a highly educated pair aroused widespread public criticism.

Upon graduation from university, Hiratsuka entered the Narumi Women's English School where, in 1911, she founded Japan's first all-women literary magazine, Seitō (literally Bluestocking). She began the first issue with the words, "In the beginning, woman was the sun" – a reference to the Shinto sun goddess Amaterasu, legendary ancestress of the Imperial House of Japan, and to the spiritual independence which women had lost. Adopting the pen name Raichō ("Thunderbird"), she began to call for a women's spiritual revolution, and within its first few years the journal's focus shifted from literature to women's issues, including candid discussion of female sexuality, chastity and abortion. Contributors included renowned poet and women's rights proponent Yosano Akiko, among others.

Even though many Japanese became exposed to the ideas of the modern feminists, due to rebuttals by Japan's media, most did not take their ideas seriously, thinking that Raichō and her comrades were attempting to steal a moment of fame in history. Exaggerated stories of their love affairs and nonconformism, once again spread by Japan's mainstream press, turned public opinion against the magazine and prompted Raichō to publish several fierce defenses of her ideals. Her April 1913 essay "To the Women of the World" rejected the conventional role of women as ryōsai kenbo (Good wife and wise mother): "I wonder how many women have, for the sake of financial security in their lives, entered into loveless marriages to become one man's lifelong servant and prostitute." This nonconformism pitted Seitō not only against the society but the state, contributing to the censorship of women's magazines that "disturbed public order" or introduced "Western ideas about women" incompatible with Japan.

The journal folded in 1915, but not before establishing its founder as a leading light in Japan's women's movement. Meanwhile, in 1914, Hiratsuka began living openly with her younger lover, artist Okumura Hiroshi, with whom she had two children out of wedlock and eventually married in 1941.

From 1918 to 1919, Yosano Akiko started to claim the importance of women's financial independence in the context of the rapid development of capitalism in Japan after the end of World War I. Since Hiratsuka were influenced by Key's argument for the priority of motherhood through her translated works, she claimed that complete independence was an impractical expectation in the situation at that time, and added that maternity protection with financial assistance by the government would be necessary to establish women's national, social existence in the context of the difficult condition of women's workers, against Yosano's argument. Afterwards, Yamakawa Kikue and Yamada Waka participated in this debate, and it became a big social movement known as the Maternity Protection Controversy (母性保護論争, Bosei-hogo ronso).

In 1920, following an investigation into female workers' conditions in textile factories in Nagoya which further galvanized her political resolve, Hiratsuka founded the New Women's Association (Shin-fujin kyokai) together with fellow women's rights activist Ichikawa Fusae. It was largely through this group's efforts that Article 5 of the Police Security Regulations—which, enacted in 1900, had barred women from joining political organizations and holding or attending political meetings—was overturned in 1922. Women's suffrage, however, remained elusive in Japan. A further and more controversial campaign attempted to ban men with venereal disease from marrying. This unsuccessful campaign remains a point of controversy surrounding Hiratsuka's career in that it saw her aligning herself with the eugenics movement, asserting that the spread of V.D. was having a detrimental effect on the Japanese "race".

Hiratsuka would join the cooperative movement in the 1930s, concluding that this would be the best option to include the most number of people towards the main goal of social reform. The next several years, however, saw Hiratsuka withdraw somewhat from the public eye, saddled with debts and her lover beset with health problems, although she would continue to write and lecture. In the postwar years, she emerged again as a public figure through the peace movement. In 1950, the day after the outbreak of the Korean War, she traveled to the United States together with writer and activist Nogami Yaeko and three other members of the Japan Women's Movement in order to present US Secretary of State Dean Acheson with a request that a system be created in which Japan could remain neutral and pacifist. Hiratsuka continued to champion women's rights in the postwar era, founding the New Japan Women's Association in 1963 together with Nogami and noted artist Iwasaki Chihiro, and continuing to write and lecture up until her death in 1971.

Legacy 
While her career as a political activist covered many decades, Hiratsuka is primarily remembered for her stewardship of the Seitō group. As a leading light of the women's movement in early twentieth century Japan, she was a highly influential figure whose devotees ranged from pioneering Korean feminist author Na Hye-sok who was a student in Tokyo during Seitōs heyday, to anarchist and social critic Itō Noe whose membership in the Seitō organization generated some controversy. Her postwar organization, the New Japan Women's Organization, remains active to this day.

On 10 February 2014, Google celebrated Raicho Hiratsuka’s 128th Birthday with a doodle.

Selected works

Original works
  (Marumado yori, The View from the Round Window)
  (Genshi, josei wa taiyō de atta, In The Beginning Woman Was The Sun)
  (Watakushi no aruita michi, The Road I Walked)

Translations
 Ellen Karolina Key, The Renaissance of Motherhood (Bosei no fukkō)
 Ellen Karolina Key, Love and Marriage (Ai to kekkon)
 Teruko Craig, In the Beginning, Woman Was the Sun – The Autobiography of a Japanese Feminist(Genshi, josei wa taiyō de atta)

See also 
 Bluestocking journal (Seitō)
 Blue Stockings Society (Seitō-sha)
 Feminism
 List of peace activists
 Fusae Ichikawa
 Ellen Key
 Akiko Yosano
 Timeline of women's suffrage
 Timeline of women's rights (other than voting)
 Women's suffrage in Japan

References

Sources
  (One Hundred Million People's Showa History from Father to Child – Modern Biographical Histories), Mainichi Shimbun Press, 1977.
 Sumiko Otsubo, Engendering Eugenics: Women's Pursuit of Anti-V.D. Marriage Restriction Law in Taisho Japan, Ohio State University Press.

External links
 Raicho Hiratsuka
 New Japan Women's Association

1886 births
1971 deaths
20th-century Japanese translators
Anarcha-feminists
Anarcho-pacifists
Buddhist feminists
Buddhist pacifists
Zen Buddhism writers
Eugenicists
Feminist writers
Japan Women's University alumni
Japanese anarchists
Japanese feminists
Japanese pacifists
Japanese suffragists
Japanese women writers
Japanese writers
Japanese Zen Buddhists
Pacifist feminists
Translators to Japanese
Writers from Tokyo